The Rivière aux Canots Est is a tributary of the Rivière aux Canots, flowing in the unorganized territories of Lac-Achouakan and Lac-Moncouche, the Lac-Saint-Jean-Est Regional County Municipality, in the administrative region of Saguenay–Lac-Saint-Jean, in the province of Quebec, in Canada. The course of the Rivière aux Canots Est crosses the Laurentides Wildlife Reserve.

The valley of the Rivière aux Canots Est is served indirectly by the route 169. This valley is also served by a few secondary forest roads, especially for forestry and recreational tourism activities.

Forestry is the main economic activity in this valley; recreational tourism, second.

The surface of the Rivière aux Canots Est is usually frozen from the beginning of December to the end of March, however the safe circulation on the ice is generally done from mid-December to mid-March.

Geography 
The main watersheds neighboring the Rivière aux Canots Est are:
 north side: Suzor-Côté lake, Bousquet lake, Pikauba River, Pika River;
 east side: Gauthier brook, Bergeron brook, Pikauba River, Apica River, Mignault Lake, Leboeuf brook;
 south side: Rivière aux Canots, Lampron Lake, Caché Creek, Jubinville Lake, Caché Lake, Willie Lake, Apica River;
 west side: Rivière aux Canots, Rivière aux Écorces, Lac à la Culotte.

The Rivière aux Canots Est rises at Lac Bonjour in a forest area in the Laurentides Wildlife Reserve. This lake is mainly fed by the outlet (coming from the northeast) from Lake Calderly and the outlet (coming from the north) from Lac des Hannetons. This source is located at:
  south-west of route 169;
  northwest of the summit of mount Apica;
  south of lac Suzor-Côté;
  north-west of the hamlet Mont-Apica;
  east of the Pika River;
  north-east of the confluence of the east Aux Canots river and the Aux Canots river.

  to the south by collecting the discharge (coming from the east), to the Gauthier stream (coming from the east). Note: the first half of this segment is in the marsh area;
  to the south in particular by collecting the discharge (coming from the east) from Lake Plutus, by collecting the discharge (coming from the northwest) from Lac des Pâturins and by crossing a lake not identified over its full length, up to its mouth. Note: This lake receives the discharge from Bergeron stream on the south side;
  towards the south-west, forming a loop towards the south in the marsh area, to its mouth.

The Rivière aux Canots Est flows into the northeast bank of the Rivière aux Canots. This confluence is located at:
  north-west of Lac Lampron;
  south-east of Lac du Panache;
  south-west of route 169;
  east of the confluence of Rivière aux Canots and Rivière aux Écorces;
  south-east of the confluence of the Pikauba River and the Rivière aux Écorces;
  south-east of the confluence of the Pikauba River and Kenogami Lake;
  southwest of the confluence of the Chicoutimi River and the Saguenay River in the Chicoutimi sector of the city of Saguenay (city).

Toponymy 
The toponym "Rivière aux Canots Est" was formalized on December 5, 1968, at the Bank of Place Names of the Commission de toponymie du Québec.

Notes and references

Appendices

Related articles 
 Lac-Saint-Jean-Est Regional County Municipality
 Lac-Moncouche, a TNO
 Lac-Achouakan, a TNO
 Laurentides Wildlife Reserve
 Rivière aux Canots
 Rivière aux Écorces
 Pikauba River
 Kenogami Lake
 Chicoutimi River
 Saguenay River
 List of rivers of Quebec

Rivers of Saguenay–Lac-Saint-Jean
Lac-Saint-Jean-Est Regional County Municipality
Laurentides Wildlife Reserve